Cedric O. Burnside (born August 26, 1978) is an American electric blues guitarist, drummer, singer and songwriter. He is the son of blues drummer Calvin Jackson and  grandson of blues singer, songwriter, and guitarist R. L. Burnside.

Amongst many others, Burnside has played drums, either live or on record, with R. L. Burnside, Jessie Mae Hemphill, John Hermann, Kenny Brown, Richard Johnston, Jimmy Buffett, T-Model Ford, Paul "Wine" Jones, Widespread Panic, Afrissippi, and the Jon Spencer Blues Explosion.

Early life and education
Burnside was born in Memphis, Tennessee, United States, to Calvin Jackson and Linda Burnside, and raised in Holly Springs, Mississippi, in the house of his grandfather, R. L. Burnside, and the extended family. By the age of 13, he began to tour with his grandfather's band, as a drummer. He had overlapped his father's time in the band, and would eventually replace him on the drums.

Career
In 2002, Burnside played on Richard Johnston's debut album, Foot Hill Stomp. Burnside followed this two years later by playing percussion on Johnston's Official Bootleg #1 album.

A short-term partnership of Cedric with Garry Burnside (his uncle two years elder) in 2006, saw them record The Record, billed as Burnside Exploration. They had tour dates as opening act and jam partners for Widespread Panic.

Later in 2006 in Clarksdale, Mississippi, Burnside teamed up with Lightnin' Malcolm, and they both toured and recorded the Juke Joint Duo album. In 2008 they released Two Man Wrecking Crew, on which Jason Ricci played harmonica and Etta Britt performed backing vocals. It won a Blues Music Award for 'Best New Artist Debut' in 2009. The duo also toured with the Big Head Blues Club, a collaboration which led to them jointly recording the album, 100 Years Of Robert Johnson in 2011, to mark the centennial of the birth of Robert Johnson.

Another collaboration followed, this time with his younger sibling, Cody Burnside, plus his uncle, Garry Burnside, which created the Cedric Burnside Project. From 2011 he recorded and toured with Trenton Ayers. In 2011, The Way I Am album was released. Burnside's brother, Cody, died in 2012, and their father followed in 2015.

In late 2012 he recorded the album Allison Burnside Express with Bernard Allison, released in 2014.

Burnside's 2013's Hear Me When I Say, and the later Descendants of Hill Country (2015), were issued under the Cedric Burnside Project name and using the guitar playing of Ayers. The latter was funded using a Kickstarter campaign.

Burnside has had cameo appearances in three films – Tempted and Big Bad Love (both 2001), and Black Snake Moan (2006).

Burnside has performed with Lightnin' Malcolm at  Roots N Blues N BBQ Festival (2008), Memphis in May, Notodden Blues Festival (both 2009), and Voodoo Experience (2010).

In 2018 he released the album Benton County Relic, which he recorded with Brian Jay of Pimps of Joytime.  Benton County Relic was nominated for Best Traditional Blues Album at the 61st Annual Grammy Awards in 2019.

Awards and honors
In 2013, Burnside won the Memphis Blues Award as 'Drummer of the Year' for the third time.

Burnside won his fourth overall, and third consecutive Blues Music Award in May 2014, in the category of 'Instrumentalist - Drums'. He won the award again in 2019, and 2020.

The album Descendants of Hill Country, was nominated for a Grammy Award in 2016 for Best Blues Album.

Benton County Relic was nominated for Best Traditional Blues Album at the 61st Annual Grammy Awards in 2019.

He is a recipient of a 2021 National Heritage Fellowship awarded by the National Endowment for the Arts, which is the United States government's highest honor in the folk and traditional arts.

For his album I Be Trying, Burnside won the Best Traditional Blues Album at the 64th Annual Grammy Awards in 2022.

Discography

See also
List of electric blues musicians

References

External links and further reading
Official Website
2014 interview with Burnside
Extended discography at CD Universe

"Mississippi Hill Country Blues, The Next Generation", Living Blues. Issue 189, April 2007.
Cedric Burnside coverage by WXPN Mississippi Blues Project
 
 

1978 births
Living people
American blues singers
20th-century African-American male singers
Blues drummers
Electric blues musicians
American blues guitarists
American male guitarists
Songwriters from Mississippi
People from Memphis, Tennessee
People from Holly Springs, Mississippi
Songwriters from Tennessee
Guitarists from Mississippi
Guitarists from Tennessee
21st-century American guitarists
21st-century drummers
21st-century American male singers
21st-century American singers
African-American songwriters
African-American guitarists
National Heritage Fellowship winners
21st-century African-American male singers
American male songwriters